Krzemień  (formerly German Kremmin) is a village in the administrative district of Gmina Dobrzany, within Stargard County, West Pomeranian Voivodeship, in north-western Poland.

For the history of the region, see History of Pomerania.

Notable residents
 Andreas Hakenberger (1574–1627), German composer

References

Villages in Stargard County